Su Nan-cheng (14 January 1936 – 2 September 2014) was a Taiwanese politician and Senior Advisor to ROC President Chen Shui-bian. He was a mayor of Tainan, serving from 1977 to 1985, and an appointed mayor of Kaohsiung, serving from 1985 to 1990. He was the speaker of the ROC National Assembly in 1999. Su was in the Kuomintang and was part of the faction that supported the Taiwanese localization movement. He was expelled from the KMT twice: first in 1972 for violating a party resolution and running for Tainan City Mayor as an independent; second in 1999 for forwarding a term-extension amendment in the National Assembly against party orders. In 2003, Su openly supported DPP candidate Chen Shui-bian in the 2004 presidential election.

Tainan mayoralty 
Su was elected the mayor of Tainan in 1976 as an independent candidate. In 1981, he was nominated by the Kuomintang to run again and was re-elected. He served from 1977 to 1985, until he was appointed the mayor of Kaohsiung. During his term as Tainan mayor, he was recognized by the Ramon Magsaysay Award. He ran unsuccessfully for mayor of Tainan in 2001 as an independent candidate, and was elected a city council member instead.

He died of heart failure in 2014.

Notes

References 
 重修台灣省通志 Ed. Liu Ning-yen. Taipei City: Taiwan Province Document Council (台灣省文獻委員會), 1994

1936 births
2014 deaths
Kuomintang politicians in Taiwan
Mayors of Kaohsiung
Mayors of Tainan
Senior Advisors to President Chen Shui-bian
Ramon Magsaysay Award winners
Tainan City Councilors
Expelled members of the Kuomintang